Melanoides is a genus of freshwater snail with an operculum, an aquatic gastropod mollusk in the subfamily Thiarinae of the family Thiaridae.

Species
Species within the genus Melanoides include:
 Melanoides admirabilis (Smith, 1880)
 Melanoides agglutinans (Bequaert & Clench, 1941)
 Melanoides angolensis Mandahl-Barth, 1974
 Melanoides anomala (Dautzenberg & Germain, 1914)
 † Melanoides apirospira (Fontannes, 1884) 
 † Melanoides apscheronica (Andrusov, 1923) 
 † Melanoides aspera Youluo, 1978 
 † Melanoides aspericostata Y.-T. Li, 1987 
 Melanoides bavayi (Dautzenberg & Germain, 1914)
 † Melanoides castrepiscopalensis (Almera, 1894) 
 † Melanoides catalaunica (Almera & Bofill y Poch, 1895) 
 † Melanoides conica Macaleț, 2002 
 Melanoides crawshayi (Smith, 1893)
 † Melanoides cretaceus Yen, 1966 
 † Melanoides curvicosta (Deshayes in Geoffroy Saint-Hilaire et al., 1832) 
 Melanoides depravata (Dupuis & Putzeys, 1900)
 † Melanoides devestita Stache, 1889 
 † Melanoides diestopleura (Fontannes, 1884) 
 Melanoides dupuisi (Spence, 1923)
 Melanoides elisabethkernae Thach & F. Huber, 2021
 Melanoides enomotoi Pilsbry, 1924
 † Melanoides ettingshauseni (Dainelli, 1901) 
 Melanoides fasciata (J. Sowerby, 1819) 
 † Melanoides falcicostata (Hofmann, 1870) 
 Melanoides fasciolata Olivier, 1804: synonym of Melanoides tuberculata (O. F. Müller, 1774)
 † Melanoides fettkei (Weaver, 1912) 
 † Melanoides floristriata Youluo, 1978 
 † Melanoides florivaricosa Youluo, 1978 
 † Melanoides furuhjelmi (C. Mayer, 1869) 
 † Melanoides gilletae Rey, 1974 
 † Melanoides glypta Youluo, 1978 
 † Melanoides heberti (Hermite, 1879)  (temporary name, junior primary homonym of M. heberti Hantken, 1878; no replacement name or synonym available)
 Melanoides hoekzemai van Benthem Jutting, 1963
 † Melanoides jeanteti Rey, 1967 
 Melanoides jugicostis (Hanley & Theobald, 1876)
 † Melanoides juliani (Roman, 1912) 
 †Melanoides kainarensis Starobogatov & Izzatullaev, 1980
 Melanoides kisangani Pilsbry & Bequaert, 1927
 Melanoides kinshassaensis (Dupuis & Putzeys, 1900)
 Melanoides lamberti (Crosse, 1869)
 Melanoides langi Pilsbry & Bequaert, 1927
 Melanoides laxa (Mousson, 1869)
 Melanoides liebrechtsi (Dautzenberg, 1901)
 † Melanoides lusitanica (Roman, 1907) 
 † Melanoides macra Y.-T. Li, 1987 
 Melanoides magnifica (Bourguignat, 1889)
 Melanoides manguensis (Thiele, 1928)
 † Melanoides martinsoni Zharnyl'skaya, 1965 
 Melanoides mweruensis (Smith, 1893)
 Melanoides nodicincta (Dohrn, 1865)
 Melanoides nsendweensis (Dupuis & Putzeys, 1900)
 Melanoides nyangweensis (Dupuis & Putzeys, 1900)
 Melanoides nyassana (Smith, 1877)
 † Melanoides otatumei Suzuki, 1944 
 † Melanoides pachecoi (Vidal, 1917) 
 † Melanoides pamirica Lindholm, 1930
 † Melanoides pectinicostata Youluo, 1978 
 † Melanoides peregrina (Mousson, 1869)
 Melanoides pergracilis (Martens, 1897)
 Melanoides polymorpha (Smith, 1877)
 † Melanoides procurvirostra Kókay, 2006 
 Melanoides psorica (Morelet, 1864)
 Melanoides pupiformis (Smith, 1877)
 Melanoides recticosta (Martens, 1882)
 † Melanoides rwebishengoensis Van Damme & Pickford, 2003 
 † Melanoides sepulchralis (Fontannes, 1884) 
 Melanoides shahdaraensis Starobogatov & Izzatullaev, 1980
 † Melanoides solitaria Stache, 1889 
 † Melanoides sphecodes (Fontannes, 1884) 
 † Melanoides striata Y.-T. Li, 1987 
 Melanoides swinhoei A. Adams, 1870
 † Melanoides tourainei Rey, 1974 
  † Melanoides tournoueri (Fuchs, 1877)
 Melanoides truncatelliformis (Bourguignat, 1885)
 Melanoides tuberculata (O. F. Müller, 1774) - Red-rimmed melania
 † Melanoides tudorae Stache, 1889 
 † Melanoides tuozhuangensis Youluo, 1978 
 Melanoides turriculus (I. Lea, 1850) - fawn melania
 Melanoides turritispira (Smith, 1877)
 † Melanoides umbraculiformis Youluo, 1978 
 † Melanoides vandenbosschei Van Damme & Pickford, 2003 
 † Melanoides verniersi Van Damme & Pickford, 2003 
 Melanoides victoriae (Dohrn, 1865)
 † Melanoides vidali (Cossmann, 1898) 
 Melanoides voltae (Thiele, 1928)
 Melanoides wagenia Pilsbry & Bequaert, 1927
 † Melanoides winkleri (Mayer, 1861)
 † Melanoides wollebeni Perrilliat & Vega in Perrilliat et al., 2008 
 † Melanoides yolandae Perrilliat & Vega in Perrilliat et al., 2008 
Species brought into synonymy
 Melanoides abchasica (Seninski, 1905): synonym of † Tinnyea abchasica (Seninski, 1905) 
 Melanoides conicus Macaleț, 2002: synonym of † Melanoides conica Macaleț, 2002 
 Melanoides riqueti (Grateloup, 1840): synonym of Sermyla riqueti (Grateloup, 1840)

References

External links 
 Olivier, G.A. (1804). Voyage dans l'Empire Othoman, l'Égypte et la Perse, fair par ordre du Gouvernement, pendant les six premières années de la République. Tome second, ii pp. + 466 pp. + Errata (1 pp.); Atlas, 2d livraison: vii pp., pl. 18-32. Paris (H. Agasse)
  Brot, A. (1874-1879). Die Melaniaceen (Melanidae) in Abbildungen der Natur mit Beschreibungen. In: Systematisches Conchylien-Cabinet von Martini und Chemnitz. Ersten Bandes, vierundzwanzigste Abtheilung. (1) 24 (229): 1-32, pls. 1-6 (1874); (1) 24 (235): 33-80, pls. 7-12 (1875); (1) 24 (244): 81-128, pls. 13-18 (1875); (1) 24 (249): 129-192, pls. 19-24 (1876); (1) 24 (259): 193-272, pls. 25-30 (1877); (1) 24 (264): 273-352, pls. 31-36 (1877); (1) 24 (271): 353-400, pls. 37-42 (1878); (1) 24 (280): 401-456, pls. 43-48 (1879); (1) 24 (283): 457-488, pl. 49 (1879). Nürnberg (Bauer & Raspe).
 Brot, A. (1870). Catalogue of the recent species of the family Melanidae American Journal of Conchology. 6: 271-325,
 Bourguignat, J.-R. (1889). Mélanidées du lac Nyassa suivies d'un aperçu comparatif sur la faune malacologique de ce lac avec celle du grand lac Tanganika. Bulletins de la Société malacologique de France. 6: 1-66, pl. 1-2. (± December) Paris
 Roman F. (1912 ("1910")). Faune saumâtre du Sannoisien du Gard. Bulletin de la Société Géologique de France. ser. 4, 10: 927-955, pls 22-24
 Glaubrecht M., Brinkmann N. & Pöppe J. (2009). Diversity and disparity ‘down under': Systematics, biogeography and reproductive modes of the ‘marsupial' freshwater Thiaridae (Caenogastropoda, Cerithioidea) in Australia. Zoosystematics and Evolution. 85(2): 199-275.
 Annandale, T. N. & Prashad, B. (1919). The Mollusca of the inland waters of Baluchistan and of Seistan, with a note on the liver-fluke of sheep in Seistan, by S. W. Kemp. Records of the Indian Museum. 18: 17-63

Thiaridae